Gregor Wentzel (17 February 1898 – 12 August 1978) was a German physicist known for development of quantum mechanics. Wentzel, Hendrik Kramers, and Léon Brillouin developed the Wentzel–Kramers–Brillouin approximation in 1926. In his early years, he contributed to X-ray spectroscopy, but then broadened out to make contributions to quantum mechanics, quantum electrodynamics, and meson theory.

Life and education 
Gregor Wentzel was born in Düsseldorf, Germany, as the first of four children of Joseph and Anna Wentzel. He married Anna "Anny" Pohlmann in 1929 and his only child, Donat Wentzel, was born in 1934. The family moved to the USA in 1948 until he and Anny returned to Ascona, Switzerland in 1970.

Career 

Wentzel began his university education in mathematics and physics in 1916, at the University of Freiburg. During 1917 and 1918, he served in the armed forces during World War I. He then resumed his education at Freiburg until 1919, when he went to the University of Greifswald. In 1920, he went to the Ludwig Maximilian University of Munich (LMU) to study under Arnold Sommerfeld. Wentzel was awarded his doctorate in 1921 and completed his Habilitation in 1922. He remained at LMU as a Privatdozent until he was called to the University of Leipzig in 1926 as an extraordinarius professor of mathematical physics. In 1926, Wentzel, Hendrik Kramers, and Léon Brillouin independently developed what became known as the Wentzel–Kramers–Brillouin approximation, also known as the WKB approximation, classical approach, and phase integral method.
He became ordinarius professor in the Chair for Theoretical Physics, at the University of Zurich, when he succeeded Erwin Schrödinger, in 1928, the same year Wolfgang Pauli was appointed to the ETH Zurich. Together, Wentzel and Pauli built the reputation of Zurich as a center for theoretical physics. In 1948, Wentzel took a professorship at the University of Chicago. He retired in 1970 and went to spend his last years in Ascona, Switzerland. In 1975, he was awarded the Max Planck Medal.

Bibliography

Books 
 Gregor Wentzel. Einführung in die Quantentheorie der Wellenfelder. Franz Deuticke, 1943, 1946. Ann Arbor, Michigan: J.w. Edwards, 1943, 1946. (Translated by Charlotte Houtermans and J. M. Jauch, with an Appendix by J. M. Jauch. Quantum Theory of Fields. Interscience, 1949. Dover, 2003.) 
 Gregor Wentzel. Lectures on Strong Coupling Meson Theory at the University of Rochester. 1954.
 Gregor Wentzel and notes by K. K. Gupta. Lectures on Special Topics in Field Theory. Lectures on Mathematics and Physics: Physics. Tata Institute of Fundamental Research, 1957.
 Gregor Wentzel. Lectures on Special Topics in Quantum Mechanics. Lectures on Mathematics and Physics. Physics, 3. Tata Institute of Fundamental Research, 1965.

Articles 
 Arnold Sommerfeld and Gregor Wentzel. Über reguläre und irreguläre Dublett, Zeitschrift für Physik 7 86–92 (1921) as cited in Sommerfeld Bibliography.

Notes

References 
 Jungnickel, Christa and Russell McCormmach. Intellectual Mastery of Nature: Theoretical Physics from Ohm to Einstein, Volume 1: The Torch of Mathematics, 1800 to 1870. University of Chicago Press, paper cover, 1990. 
 Jungnickel, Christa and Russell McCormmach. Intellectual Mastery of Nature. Theoretical Physics from Ohm to Einstein, Volume 2: The Now Mighty Theoretical Physics, 1870 to 1925. University of Chicago Press, Paper cover, 1990. 
 Mehra, Jagdish, and Helmut Rechenberg. The Historical Development of Quantum Theory. Volume 1 Part 1 The Quantum Theory of Planck, Einstein, Bohr and Sommerfeld 1900–1925: Its Foundation and the Rise of Its Difficulties. Springer, 2001. 
 Mehra, Jagdish, and Helmut Rechenberg. The Historical Development of Quantum Theory. Volume 5 Erwin Schrödinger and the Rise of Wave Mechanics. Part 2 Schrödinger in Vienna and Zurich 1887–1925. Springer, 2001. 
 Schiff, Leonard I. Quantum Mechanics. McGraw-Hill, 3rd edition, 1968.

Further reading 
 Peter G. O. Freund, Charles J. Goebel, and Yoichiro Nambu, Editors. Quanta: Collection of Papers Dedicated to Gregor Wentzel. University of Chicago Press, 1970.

External links 
 Thomas S. Kuhn. Oral History Transcript – Gregor Wentzel.  Niels Bohr Library and Archives, American Institute of Physics, 1964.
 Peter G. O. Freund, Charles J. Goebel, Yoichiro Nambu, and Reinhard Oehme. Gregor Wentzel 1898–1978 – A Biographical Memoir. National Academy of Sciences, 2009.
 S.Antoci and D.-E.Liebscher. The Third Way to Quantum Mechanics is the Forgotten First. Annales Fond.Broglie 21 (1996) 349.
 Gregor Wentzel – ETH Bibliothek.
 

1898 births
1978 deaths
20th-century German physicists
Quantum physicists
Academic staff of the Ludwig Maximilian University of Munich
Academic staff of Leipzig University
Academic staff of the University of Zurich
University of Chicago faculty
University of Greifswald alumni
Ludwig Maximilian University of Munich alumni
Theoretical physicists
Mathematical physicists
Members of the United States National Academy of Sciences
Winners of the Max Planck Medal